Bubanza is a city located in northwestern Burundi. It is the capital city of Bubanza Province. It is also the seat of the Commune of Bubanza. Notable personalities from this province include Manasse Nzobonimpa, the province's first post-war governor, Gabriel Ntisezerana, former second Vice-president of the Republic and Pascal Nyabenda, former president of the Burundi National Assembly.

References

Populated places in Burundi
Bubanza Province